Marc Lichte is a German automobile designer, the head of design at Audi since February 2014.

Early life
He grew up in the north-west of West Germany.

He studied Transportation Design at university.

Career

He joined Volkswagen Group in 1996. At VW he was taught by Hartmut Warkuß, the designer of the first Audi 80, and the former head of design at Audi for twenty five years.

Work 

 Audi e-tron GT
 Audi Grandsphere concept
 Volkswagen Golf Mk5
 Volkswagen Golf Mk6
 Volkswagen Golf Mk7
 Volkswagen Passat (B8)
 Volkswagen Arteon

See also
 Jörg Bensinger, developer of Audi's four-wheel transmission

References

External links
 Audi

1969 births
Living people
Audi people
German automobile designers
People from Hochsauerlandkreis
Volkswagen Group designers